Many state and local elections took place in the U.S. state of Indiana on November 4, 2008.

Presidential 
For the first time since 1964, the Democrats managed to win Indiana in a presidential election. Barack Obama, a U.S. senator from the neighboring state of Illinois won Indiana by a margin of 1.03%

United States Senate 
There was no Senate election in 2008 in Indiana.

United States House of Representatives 

The Democrats had just won a decisive victory in 2006, after picking up 3 Republican-held seats. Democrats were on to win it again

Governor 
Incumbent Mitch Daniels won re-election easily, even though Barack Obama won the state narrowly on the Presidential level.

Attorney General 
As Incumbent Steve Carter chose not to run for re-election, Republican Greg Zoeller was the republican nominee, while Democrats nominated Linda Pence. Greg Zoeller won by 400,000 votes

References

 
Indiana